Amullaivoyal, is a rural industrial area in North Chennai, a metropolitan city in Tamil Nadu, India and a part in Manali industrial area. Though it is located within Greater Chennai Corporation limits it is lack behind the development of the neighbourhood. The arterial roads to Amullaivoyal are the Ammullaivoyal - Vaikkadu Road, Anna Salai (Andarkuppam - Red Hills Road) and the Neduchezhian street. The Inner Ring Road becoming functional the area was easily accessible from the Chennai Mofussil Bus Terminus. Also, with MTC operating more buses from Manali. Tiruvottiyur railway station is the nearest Railway Station of Amullaivoyal, which is 6 km away from Amullaivoyal.

Surroundings

References

External links
Corporation of Chennai
CMDA Official Webpage

Neighbourhoods in Chennai